Staying Alive is a 1983 American dance musical film and the sequel to Saturday Night Fever (1977). Directed by Sylvester Stallone, who also co-produced and co-wrote the film with original Fever producer and writer, Robert Stigwood and Norman Wexler, respectively, the film stars John Travolta, reprising his role as Tony Manero, with Cynthia Rhodes, Finola Hughes, Joyce Hyser, Julie Bovasso, and dancers Viktor Manoel and Kevyn Morrow.

The title comes from the Bee Gees song of the same name, which was used as the theme song to Saturday Night Fever and is also played during the final scene of Staying Alive. The title also reflects Tony's circumstances at the film's beginning, in which he is barely surviving as he pursues his dream of making his dancing career.

Staying Alive was theatrically released on July 15, 1983, to universally negative critical reviews, and, released in 1983, is the oldest film to hold a score of 0% on Rotten Tomatoes. Despite this, Staying Alive was successful at the box office, earning $127 million worldwide on a $22 million budget. The film also featured the song "Far from Over" by Frank Stallone, the younger brother of Sylvester Stallone. "Far from Over" peaked at #10 on the Billboard Hot 100 and the Cashbox charts. Along with Homefront (2013), this is one of only two films that Stallone wrote without starring (although he has an uncredited cameo appearance).

Plot

Anthony "Tony" Manero, a former disco king, acts on his brother's advice and his own dreams of dancing professionally. He is now living in a Manhattan flophouse (dosshouse), working as a dance instructor and waiter at a dance club, searching for a big break in the modern dance productions on Broadway. The break from his Brooklyn life, family, and friends seem to have somewhat matured Tony and refined his personality, including his diminished Brooklyn accent, an avoidance of alcohol, and less use of profanity. Other attitudes remain unchanged, such as his disregard for his girlfriend, the forgiving Jackie, who is a dancer and rock singer. Still acting immature, Tony maintains some of his other macho and childish double standards, such as seeing other women but being offended if he sees Jackie with other men.

Tony watches a show, which features Jackie as a dancer in the chorus, but focuses on the lead, a seemingly wealthy English dancer, Laura. Tony pursues her with seduction in mind, and spends the night with her. He is annoyed when she dismisses him afterward, not understanding that she intended their encounter to be a one-night stand. Laura coldly justifies her treatment of him by saying that "Everybody uses everybody", and implies that Tony used her in order to get a dance role in her upcoming show.

Unable to trust Tony, Jackie breaks up with him. Jackie, Tony and Laura then all audition for the Broadway production, Satan's Alley. Jackie and Tony land small roles, and Laura is cast as the lead female dancer.

Tony begins to realize how callous he has been to Jackie, and walks all the way from Manhattan to his old Bay Ridge neighborhood in Brooklyn in the middle of the night. He takes stock of how much his life has changed since he left Brooklyn when walks past 2001 Odyssey, which was his hangout six years before, and is now a gay nightclub. When Tony goes to visit his mother, and apologizes for his selfishness and the troublemaking ways of his youth, she points out that his selfish behavior as a teen was what helped him escape a dead-end life in Bay Ridge. Tony feels better after this and heads back to Manhattan to repair his relationship with Jackie. His hostility and distance from the arrogant Laura increase as the production progresses.

Tony decides to take a shot at replacing the male lead of Satan's Alley, and requests Jackie to help him practice the number. Laura is disgusted when Tony succeeds and openly displays her resentment at having to partner him in the show. They cannot hide their chemistry on stage despite her animosity, which pleases the show's director Jesse.

Satan's Alley sells out, and the cast takes the stage to a standing-room-only crowd. The first act is a success despite Tony's brash disregard for the script when he kisses Laura at the end of their number. Laura furiously retaliates by clawing Tony's face. Jesse blasts Tony backstage, telling him to take his personal war away from the production. Laura seems to offer a truce when she asks to see him after the show to "clear things up". Now fully aware of her manipulative ways, Tony coldly tells her that he has other commitments, and Laura snidely responds that he lacks star quality.

The second act is a dazzling display of dance and special effects, and Tony suddenly abandons the script near the end of the show. He hurls Laura away and gives way to his frustration in a solo dance. He finishes and holds out his hand to Laura with a command to jump. She halts amid Jackie's and Jesse's commands, but finally leaps in his arms for a climactic finish to the show. The thrilled audience gives a standing ovation.

Tony celebrates with his jubilant castmates and reconciles with Jackie. He says that what he really must do is "strut" in celebration. He leaves the theater and struts through Times Square, beaming with his newfound success.

Cast

Richie Sambora appeared in an uncredited role as a guitarist of the local band, in which Jackie and Carl also perform. Sylvester Stallone makes an uncredited cameo appearance as a man on the street, whom Tony bumps into.

Some Fever actors were to reprise their roles but ended up removed from the final cut: Donna Pescow appeared in the audience at Tony's Broadway debut, and Val Bisoglio appeared briefly as Tony's father. His scene was deleted, and the film instead vaguely implies that he has died.

Production

Development and writing

Saturday Night Fever producer and writer Robert Stigwood and Norman Wexler started planning a sequel soon after the original film came out in 1977, due to the film's success. They came up with the title Staying Alive, and Wexler wrote a script. Travolta was open to the idea of a sequel, but did not like the pessimism of the script, thinking that his character, Tony Manero, needed to see more success as a dancer. Stigwood and executives from Paramount Pictures spent the next several years trying to convince Travolta to film the script as written, but with no success. The project was considered abandoned, but then, in 1981, Stigwood met with Travolta to get Travolta's views on how a sequel should go. Travolta stated that he wanted Manero to attempt a dance career on Broadway and end up in a leading role due to his talent. Wexler wrote another script based on Travolta's ideas, in which Manero becomes a Broadway dancer but remains in the chorus. Travolta agreed to participate in the film, though he preferred an ending more like the one he had envisioned: he agreed that Wexler's ending was a more realistic outcome, but felt that it would not be sufficiently exciting for audiences.

It was then time to find a director for Staying Alive, and Travolta, who had just seen the film Rocky III (which Stallone wrote, directed and starred in), told his agent that he wanted a director who could bring the energy and pacing of that film to Staying Alive. To Travolta's surprise, Paramount, with the help of then-studio chief Michael Eisner, was able to bring in Stallone himself. Travolta told Stallone about his idea for a happier ending, and Stallone rewrote the script to more closely match Travolta's vision. Stallone also made the Manero character more mature – given that the character was now six years older than in the original film – and made the film's language tamer than that of the first film, to ensure that it got a PG rating.

Under Stallone's supervision, Travolta spent five months doing rigorous training to develop a dancer's physique for the film, losing 20 pounds in the process.

Music

Soundtrack

The soundtrack was released in 1983 and is mainly performed by the Bee Gees. Five new Bee Gees songs (all of which have lead vocals by Barry Gibb) took up the first side, with side two featuring various artists performing songs mostly written by Frank Stallone, brother of the film's director Sylvester Stallone. The soundtrack reached number 14 in the United Kingdom, number 6 in the United States, number 1 in Switzerland, and number 2 in Italy and Japan. The LP was the final soundtrack, and the final songs, by the Bee Gees released under RSO.

All tracks on Side A are written and performed by the Bee Gees (Barry, Maurice, and Robin Gibb). "Stayin' Alive" was shortened exclusively for the soundtrack, the full song is actually used in the film.

Out of the songs featured in Staying Alive (excluding instrumental Muzak tracks), only "Waking Up" by Frank Stallone and Cynthia Rhodes, and "The Winning End" by Joe Esposito did not make it to the soundtrack; and "Breakout" by the Bee Gees was not featured in the film. "Waking Up" would later be released as the B-side to the "Far from Over" single, except as a solo version with Rhodes' vocals removed. A brief excerpt of a third duet with Frank Stallone and Cynthia Rhodes titled "Hope We Never Change" is also featured in the film.

Charts

Chart singles

Certifications

Reception

Box office
Despite being a critical failure, Staying Alive was a commercial success. The film opened with the biggest weekend for a musical film ever (at the time) with a gross of $12,146,143 from 1,660 screens. Overall, the film grossed nearly $65 million domestically against its $22 million budget. Worldwide it grossed $127 million. Though the domestic box office intake was less than the $94.2 million earned by Saturday Night Fever, the film nevertheless ranked in the top ten most financially successful films of 1983.

Critical response
Staying Alive was unanimously panned by film critics. On review aggregator website Rotten Tomatoes, the film has a rare approval rating of 0% based on 28 reviews, with an average rating of 3/10. The site's consensus reads: "This sequel to Saturday Night Fever is shockingly embarrassing and unnecessary, trading the original's dramatic depth for a series of uninspired dance sequences." On Metacritic, on the other hand, which assigns a weighted average, the movie holds a score of 23 out of 100 based on 7 reviews, indicating "generally unfavorable reviews."

Roger Ebert of The Chicago Sun-Times, who had praised Saturday Night Fever, called the dance productions in Stayin' Alive "laughably gauche", especially the final number, which he mocked for including "fire, ice, smoke, flashing lights and laser beams". Ebert added that what the film most lacked was "the sense of reality in Saturday Night Fever... There's no old neighborhood, no vulgar showdowns with his family (he apologizes to his mother for his "attitude"!) and no Brooklyn eccentricity." In 2006, Entertainment Weekly dubbed Staying Alive the "Worst Sequel Ever." Many critics were unanimous in agreeing that the film did not contain the grittiness and realism that was possessed by Saturday Night Fever.

Accolades
The film is listed in Golden Raspberry Award founder John Wilson's book, The Official Razzie Movie Guide, as one of the 100 Most Enjoyably Bad Movies Ever Made.

References

External links

 
 
 
 
 
 
 
 Movie stills

1980s dance films
1980s English-language films
1980s romantic musical films
1983 films
1983 romantic drama films
American dance films
American musical drama films
American romantic drama films
American romantic musical films
American sequel films
Films about actors
Films about musical theatre
Films à clef
Films directed by Sylvester Stallone
Films produced by Robert Stigwood
Films set in a theatre
Films set in Manhattan
Films shot in Los Angeles
Films shot in New York City
Films with screenplays by Norman Wexler
Films with screenplays by Sylvester Stallone
Paramount Pictures films
1980s American films